Nicolás Uriarte (born 21 March 1990) is an Argentine volleyball player. He was a member of the Argentina national team, and participant at the Olympic Games London 2012. At the professional club level, he plays for Sada Cruzeiro.

Personal life
Uriarte was born in Buenos Aires. His father, Jon Uriarte, is a former volleyball player, bronze medallist at the Olympic Games (Seoul 1988), and a previous head coach of the Australia men's national volleyball team.

Career

Clubs
In 2013, he signed a contract with PGE Skra Bełchatów and won the Polish Champion title in 2014. On 8 October 2014, his team won the Polish SuperCup. In February 2015, he signed a next two–year contract with Skra until 2017. On 7 February 2016, he won the Polish Cup after beating ZAKSA in the final.

Honours

Clubs
 CSV South American Club Championship
  Brazil 2018 – with Sada Cruzeiro

 CEV Challenge Cup
  2021/2022 – with Narbonne Volley

FIVB Club World Championship
  2022 – with Sada Cruzeiro

 National championships
 2013/2014  Polish Championship, with PGE Skra Bełchatów
 2014/2015  Polish SuperCup, with PGE Skra Bełchatów
 2015/2016  Polish Cup, with PGE Skra Bełchatów
 2017/2018  Brazilian SuperCup, with Sada Cruzeiro
 2017/2018  Brazilian Cup, with Sada Cruzeiro
 2017/2018  Brazilian Championship, with Sada Cruzeiro
 2018/2019  Brazilian Championship, with Vôlei Taubaté

Youth national team
 2006  CSV U19 South American Championship

Individual awards
 2007: FIVB U19 World Championship – Best Setter
 2013: CSV South American Club Championship – Best Defender
 2018: CSV South American Club Championship – Best Setter
 2022: CEV Challenge Cup – Most Valuable Player

References

External links

 
 Player profile at LegaVolley.it 
 Player profile at PlusLiga.pl 
 
 
 Player profile at Volleybox.net

1990 births
Living people
Volleyball players from Buenos Aires
Argentine men's volleyball players
Polish Champions of men's volleyball
Olympic volleyball players of Argentina
Volleyball players at the 2012 Summer Olympics
Pan American Games medalists in volleyball
Pan American Games gold medalists for Argentina
Pan American Games bronze medalists for Argentina
Volleyball players at the 2011 Pan American Games
Medalists at the 2011 Pan American Games
Volleyball players at the 2015 Pan American Games
Medalists at the 2015 Pan American Games
Argentine expatriate sportspeople in Italy
Expatriate volleyball players in Italy
Argentine expatriate sportspeople in Poland
Expatriate volleyball players in Poland
Argentine expatriate sportspeople in Brazil
Expatriate volleyball players in Brazil
Argentine expatriate sportspeople in France
Expatriate volleyball players in France
Skra Bełchatów players
Setters (volleyball)